Fred Lew "Curly" Morrison (October 7, 1926 – November 15, 2020) was an American football player and executive.  He played professionally in the  National Football League (NFL) with the Chicago Bears, from 1950 to 1953, and the Cleveland Browns, from 1954 to 1956.  Morrison played college football at the Ohio State University.

College career
Morrison played for the Ohio State Buckeyes from 1947 to 1949. As a sophomore, he was an end and led the Buckeyes in receptions, with seven for 113 yards.  In his junior year, he moved to fullback when starter Joe Whistler was injured in the first game of the 1948 season.  When Whistler returned, Morrison continued at fullback as a backup.

Morrison took over the fullback position as a senior in 1949 and led the Buckeyes in scoring, with nine touchdowns.  His best rushing game as a college student was against the USC Trojans, in Los Angeles, on October 8, 1949 when he rushed for 134 yards.  Later that season, the Buckeyes returned to Southern California for the 1950 Rose Bowl against the California Golden Bears.  In that game, Morrison rushed for 119 yards, and the Buckeyes won 17–14.  Morrison was named the game's MVP.  He was inducted into the Rose Bowl Hall of Fame in 1993.

Professional career
Morrison was drafted by the Chicago Bears with the tenth pick in the 1950 NFL Draft.  He was with the Bears for four years, leading the team in rushing two of those years. He was traded to the Cleveland Browns, where he spent three more years and played in three championship games. He led the Browns in rushing once (1955), making his only Pro Bowl appearance that year.

Executive career and retirement
Following his NFL career, Morrison stayed active in football.  He was the chief operating officer and general manager for the Los Angeles Express of the United States Football League (USFL) and the general manager of the Southern California Sun of the World Football League (WFL). He was an advocate for retired NFL players and was active in several charities. He and his wife, Sophie, produced the NFL Legends golf tournament in Pebble Beach, California every November benefiting The Boys and Girls Clubs of California.

He died of complications from a broken hip on November 15, 2020.

References

1926 births
2020 deaths
American football ends
American football fullbacks
American football halfbacks
Chicago Bears players
Cleveland Browns players
Ohio State Buckeyes football players
Players of American football from Columbus, Ohio
United States Football League executives
World Football League executives
Eastern Conference Pro Bowl players
Sportspeople from Columbus, Ohio